Christopher Peter Rodon (born 9 June 1963) is a Welsh former professional footballer who played as a striker.

Career
Born in Swansea, Rodon began his career in his native Wales for Pontardawe Town, before moving to England with Brighton & Hove Albion, where he made one appearance in the Football League during the 1982–83 season. Rodon also made 4 appearances on loan at Cardiff City during the 1983–84 season. After leaving Brighton, Rodon returned to Wales to play with Llanelli.

Later and personal life
Rodon's father Peter, and nephew Joe Rodon also played football professionally. His brother Keri, father of Joe, played basketball for Wales.

References

1963 births
Living people
Welsh footballers
Pontardawe Town F.C. players
Brighton & Hove Albion F.C. players
Cardiff City F.C. players
Llanelli Town A.F.C. players
English Football League players
Association football forwards